Félix Andrés Micolta or Félix Micolta for short (born 30 November 1989) is a Colombian professional footballer, who plays as a winger for Mexican club Venados.

References

External links

1989 births
Living people
Colombian footballers
Atlético Bucaramanga footballers
Once Caldas footballers
Deportes Tolima footballers
Deportivo Cali footballers
Atlético Nacional footballers
Independiente Santa Fe footballers
Uniautónoma F.C. footballers
C.S. Marítimo players
Independiente Medellín footballers
Chiapas F.C. footballers
América de Cali footballers
Avispa Fukuoka players
Figueirense FC players
Venados F.C. players
Categoría Primera A players
Primeira Liga players
Liga MX players
J2 League players
Colombian expatriate footballers
Expatriate footballers in Mexico
Expatriate footballers in Portugal
Association football wingers
Sportspeople from Nariño Department